Airgamboys is a Spanish brand of miniature figures, manufactured by the toy company Airgam since 1976.  Similar to toys like Playmobil, Madelman, or Geyperman, Airgamboys consisted of various series, including:

Soccer (Athletic Bilbao, Valencia CF, F.C. Barcelona, Real Madrid, Sevilla FC, Real Betis, Spanish National Team, English National Team, Argentina national team, Brazilian National Team, Stadium)
Individual figures (Astronaut, Aliens, cowboys, World War II soldiers,  Deep-sea diver, musketeer, Dracula, Roman, Turk)
Miss Airgam (Indian woman, Police Officer, Nurse, Huntress, Hairdresser, Teacher, Maid)
Super Fantastics (Stars Man, Bird Man, Red Masker, Panther Man, Captain Laser, Doctor Diabolic, Bad Tiger, Python)
Space (Flying Saucer, Astronaut, Galaxy Patrol, Red Planet)
Romans (Ben-Hur, Quadriga, Roman ship)
Vehicles (Jeep, Motorcycle, Helicopter)

Sources
 Blog 1000 Airgam Boys
 Airgamboys.com

Toy brands